The list of ship decommissionings in 1865 includes a chronological list of all ships decommissioned in 1865.


References

See also 

1865
 Ship decommissionings